Prumnopitys ladei, commonly known as the Mount Spurgeon black pine, Mount Spurgeon brown pine, or Mount Spurgeon kauri pine, is a species of conifer in the family Podocarpaceae. It is endemic to north-eastern Queensland, Australia, where it is restricted to Mount Lewis, Mount Spurgeon, and a few other localities nearby.

References

Pinales of Australia
ladei
Conservation dependent flora of Australia
Conservation dependent biota of Queensland
Nature Conservation Act rare biota
Rare flora of Australia
Flora of Queensland
Taxonomy articles created by Polbot